RKO 281 is a 1999 American historical drama film directed by Benjamin Ross and starring Liev Schreiber, James Cromwell, Melanie Griffith, John Malkovich, Roy Scheider, and Liam Cunningham. The film depicts the troubled production behind the 1941 film Citizen Kane. The film's title is a reference to the original production number of Citizen Kane.

Plot
In 1940, Orson Welles (Schreiber), RKO studio head George Schaefer (Scheider), and screenwriter Herman J. Mankiewicz (Malkovich) struggle in making what will be considered the greatest American film, Citizen Kane. Welles and Mankiewicz attend a party at Hearst Castle where meeting the hypocritical and tyrannical William Randolph Hearst (Cromwell) gives Welles the inspiration to make a film about Hearst's life. Mankiewicz is against it because he knows Hearst's wrath will be horrible but Welles says this is the film. Mankiewicz finally agrees. 

After learning from the gossip columnist Hedda Hopper, who had viewed a press screening, that Welles' film is actually a thinly veiled and exceptionally unflattering biography of him, publishing tycoon Hearst uses his immense power and influence to try to deny the release of the picture. Hearst's mistress, actress Marion Davies (Griffith), endures the embarrassment of having their private lives exposed and vilified. Later on in their relationship many years after the release of Citizen Kane she gives Hearst money when his finances begin to diminish (by selling all the jewelry he gave her and giving him the money in the form of a check).

In the end, after considerable delays and harassment, plus the disintegration of the professional relationship between Welles and Mankiewicz and a costly blow to Schaefer's career, the film is finally released. Its publicity is muted by Hearst's ban on its mention in all his publications and its commercial success is limited. Welles ultimately has the satisfaction of having created one of the most critically acclaimed films of all
time.

Cast
 Liev Schreiber as Orson Welles
 John Malkovich as Herman J. Mankiewicz
 Roy Scheider as George Schaefer
 James Cromwell as William Randolph Hearst
 Melanie Griffith as Marion Davies
 Liam Cunningham as Gregg Toland
 David Suchet as Louis B. Mayer
 Brenda Blethyn as Louella Parsons
 Fiona Shaw as Hedda Hopper
 Lucy Cohu as Dolores del Río

Production
The script is based in part on the 1996 American documentary film The Battle Over Citizen Kane written by Thomas Lennon and Richard Ben Cramer.
 
Producer Ridley Scott wanted to film in the Hearst Castle, but was refused access. RKO 281 was filmed in the United Kingdom, mostly around London. The Gothic stairwell in Hearst Castle was filmed in the St Pancras Renaissance London Hotel. Hearst's private quarters and office, including a marble fireplace, were filmed in the high-ceilinged Gamble Room in the Victoria & Albert Museum. The fireplace mantelpiece seen in the room was saved from Dorchester House prior to that building's demolition in 1929. The Hearst castle dining hall and ballroom was filmed in the Great Hall of the London Guildhall.

Reception
On aggregate review site Rotten Tomatoes, the film holds a "fresh" rating of 93%, based on 14 reviews.

Awards and nominations

See also
 Mank (2020)

Notes

Sources

External links

 
 

1999 drama films
1999 television films
1999 films
Best Miniseries or Television Movie Golden Globe winners
Citizen Kane
Films about films
Films about Orson Welles
HBO Films films
Scott Free Productions films
Films with screenplays by John Logan
Works about William Randolph Hearst
Cultural depictions of Orson Welles
Cultural depictions of William Randolph Hearst
Biographical films about actors